Godronia is a genus of fungi in the family Helotiaceae. The genus contains 27 species.

The genus name of Godronia is in honour of Dominique Alexandre Godron (1807-1880), who was a French physician, botanist, geologist and speleologist.

The genus was circumscribed by Jean Baptiste Mougeot and Joseph Henri Léveillé in Consid. Gen. Veg. Vosges on page 355 in 1846.

Species
 Godronia callunigena
 Godronia cassandrae
 Godronia fuliginosa
 Godronia ribis
 Godronia uberiformis
 Godronia urceolus

References

Helotiaceae
Taxa named by Joseph-Henri Léveillé